Chitra Bharucha MBE, FRCPath, FRSA, (born 6 April 1945) is a former consultant haematologist and former vice chairman of the BBC Trust, the governing body of the British Broadcasting Corporation.  She became the first woman and first South Asian ("Asian" in British English) to head the BBC

Born in Madurai, India, she has lived in the UK since 1972. She was educated at Ewart School, Madras and Christian Medical College Vellore, gaining her medical qualification before moving to the UK in 1972. Between 1981 and 2000, she was consultant clinical haematologist at Belfast City Hospital and was deputy director of the Northern Ireland Blood Transfusion Service. She was elected to the General Medical Council in 1999 where she served on a number of panels including chair of the Fitness to Practise Adjudication Panels.

In 1996 Bharucha moved into positions in the media industry, serving on the BBC Broadcasting Council for Northern Ireland until 1999. In April 2001 she was appointed Northern Ireland member of the Independent Television Commission, where she served until December 2003 when the ITC was subsumed into Ofcom, and she became a member of the Advertising Standards Authority Council in November 2004.

In April 2002, Bharucha was appointed Chair of the Advisory Committee on Animal Feedingstuffs for the Food Standards Agency, and in 2006 she was appointed Lay Member of the Review Body for Judicial Complaints. She was appointed a MBE in the 2008 New Year's Honours List for services to the animal feedstuffs industry.

BBC
In October 2006, Bharucha was appointed as Vice Chairman of the BBC Trust, the body that succeeded the Board of Governors as the governing body of the British Broadcasting Corporation. She was to be the deputy to Michael Grade, the then BBC Chairman. Grade resigned soon after the formation of the Trust on 1 November 2006 and Bharucha became the Acting BBC Chairman, a position that she held until Sir Michael Lyons took over the chairmanship on 1 May 2007.

She became a Member of the Order of the British Empire in 2009.

Bharucha stood down from her role as Vice Chairman of the Trust on 31 October 2010.

References and external links

References

 

Scientists from Madurai
1945 births
Chairmen of the BBC
Trustees of the British Broadcasting Corporation
Indian hematologists
Living people
Presidents of the Medical Women's Federation
Women scientists from Tamil Nadu
20th-century Indian medical doctors
Indian women medical doctors
Medical doctors from Tamil Nadu
20th-century women physicians
20th-century Indian women
Members of the Order of the British Empire
British corporate directors
Indian emigrants to the United Kingdom